The Texas Marine Department (1861–1865) (alt Marine Department of Military District of Texas, New Mexico, and Arizona, Trans-Mississippi Marine Department) was formed in the State of Texas shortly after Texas came under blockade from the Union Navy in 1861.  It operated under the control of the Confederate Army during the Civil War.

"The Texas Marine Department, an organization unique in the Confederacy, combined the roles of a conventional navy, revenue service, and military logistics command."

The ships in the Marine Department mainly consisted of small vessels, improvised cottonclad warships, and some captured US Navy ships.

The Department was instrumental in the liberation of Galveston, occupied by the Union, and winning the Battle of Galveston on January 1, 1863.   It was disbanded at the end of the war.

Commanders
 Commander William W. Hunter: from 1861 until December 1862. Hunter was a regular Confederate States Navy's commander (later in the war promoted to Captain, commanded the Savannah squadron).
 Leon Smith: December 1862 - August 1864. Smith was variously described as lieutenant, captain, major, colonel, and commodore, but was a volunteer not actually commissioned in either the Confederate army or navy, despite General John B. Magruder's repeated attempts to secure a commission for him.
 Lieutenant Joseph Nicholson Barney: regular Confederate States Navy officer sent to take control of operation, however following discussions with Magruder who was not willing to relinquish controls of the cottonclads, Barney conceded the appointment, and in a letter to Confederate naval secretary Stephen Mallory recommended that the navy relinquish control. Barney later explained that he made his recommendation since he considered that the presence of two separate marine forces with independent commanders would lead to discord and confusion.
 Captain Henry S. Lubbock: August 1864 - end of war. Not commissioned in Confederate States Navy, captain probably due to being ship's captain.

Ships
A. S. Ruthven, side-wheel steamer - transport
, steamer - cottonclad gunboat
CSS Clifton, side-wheel steamer - gunboat (Ex-USS Clifton): Burned March 21, 1864
Colonel Stell, side-wheel steamer - transport: Surrendered
Corpus Christi - gunboat
, steamer - transport, cottonclad and ironclad gunboat ram
Dime, steamer - transport and tender
Era No. 3, steamer - patrol ship and transport
, yacht - guard boat, dispatch boat
Florilda, steamer - transport
General Rusk, side-wheel steamer - picket boat, signal boat, tow boat, blockade runner: Captured
George Buckhart, schooner - gunboat, guard boat: Captured March 17, 1865
Grand Bay, stern-wheel steamer - transport
Island City, side-wheel steamer - supply boat
Jeff Davis, steamer - transport
John F. Carr, steamer - transport and cottonclad gunboat
Josiah A. Bell, side-wheel steamer - cottonclad gunboat
Lone Star, side-wheel steamer - transport
Lucy Gwin, stern-wheel steamer - transport
Mary Hill, side-wheel steamer - gunboat, transport, picket ship, guard ship
, steamer - gunboat, tugboat, picket boat, transport: Sunk 1863
Roebuck, side-wheel steamer - unarmed cottonclad transport
Sachem (1863), screw steamer - gunboat (Ex-USS Sachem) (1863-1864); blockade runner (1864)
Sunflower, steamer - cottonclad transport
, steamer - cottonclad gunboat

See also
 Battle of Galveston 
 USRC Harriet Lane (1857)
 List of ships of the Confederate States Navy
 Confederate States Army
 American Civil War

Bibliography

References

Gunboats of the Confederate States Navy
Ships of the Confederate States Army
1861 establishments in Texas
1865 disestablishments in Texas